is a Japanese anime director of television and film.

Hongo originally worked at Ajiado as an animator but moved to Shin-Ei Animation where he directed Crayon Shin-chan. He left in 1996 and went on to direct Immortal Grand Prix, Outlaw Star, Reideen, Shamanic Princess, and The Candidate for Goddess. He also directed and wrote the screenplay for the feature film Sakura Wars: The Movie.

Hongo is a native of Tokyo but grew up in Niigata Prefecture.

Filmography (as director)
 Ascendance of a Bookworm
 Battle Spirits: Shōnen Toppa Bashin
 Chimpui
 Crayon Shin-chan
 Deltora Quest
 Gunma-chan
 Immortal Grand Prix
 Kasumin
 Kyoro-chan
 Mainichi Kaasan
 Monster Hunter Stories: Ride On
 Outlaw Star
 Pilot Candidate
 Reideen
 Sakura Wars: The Movie
 Shamanic Princess
 Shiratori Reiko de Gozaimasu!
 Spirit of Wonder
 Tenkai Knights
 World Trigger

References

 
 
 
 Anime Style column

1959 births
Anime directors
Japanese film directors
Living people
People from Niigata Prefecture